Carlos Diego Ferreira (born January 18, 1985) is a Brazilian mixed martial artist, currently competing in the Lightweight division of the Ultimate Fighting Championship. He is the former Legacy FC lightweight champion, and vacated the championship in May 2014 to sign with UFC.

Mixed martial arts career
Born in Careiro da Várzea, Amazonas, Brazil, Ferreira grew up playing soccer, and his first martial art was capoeira. At the age of 10 Ferreira started training Brazilian jiu-jitsu. He moved to the United States in 2008 to make a career out of jiu-jitsu like his idol Ronaldo Souza. Despite faring fairly well in jiu-jitsu competition, he never captured gold in big tournaments and was forced to start teaching the sport to make a living. Subsequently Ferreira made his professional mixed martial arts debut on April 15, 2011, when he faced Joseph Daily at STFC 15. He won the fight via a split decision. Following this, Ferreira would compile an undefeated record of 9–0, also capturing the Legacy FC Lightweight Championship from Jorge Patino at Legacy FC 25. Ferreira would vacate the title in May 2014, when he signed with the Ultimate Fighting Championship.

Ultimate Fighting Championship
In his debut, Ferreira faced Colton Smith at UFC Fight Night: Swanson vs. Stephens on June 28, 2014. He won the fight via submission (rear-naked choke), winning a Performance of the Night bonus for the  victory.

For his second fight in the promotion, Ferreira faced Ramsey Nijem at UFC 177 on August 30, 2014. He won the back and forth battle via technical knockout due to punches, winning another bonus (this time as Fight of the Night).

Ferreira next faced Beneil Dariush on October 25, 2014, at UFC 179. He lost the fight via unanimous decision.

Ferreira faced Dustin Poirier on April 4, 2015, at UFC Fight Night 63. He lost the fight via knockout in the first round.

Ferreira faced Olivier Aubin-Mercier on January 30, 2016, at UFC on Fox 18. He won the fight by unanimous decision.

Ferreira was expected to face Abel Trujillo on May 29, 2016, at UFC Fight Night 88. However, Ferreira was removed from the fight on May 13 after it was announced that he had been flagged for a potential anti-doping policy violation. He was replaced by promotional newcomer Jordan Rinaldi.

On December 21, 2016, Ferreira accepted a 17-month sanction by the US Anti-Doping Agency for an anti-doping violation after declaring the use of a product that listed and contained a prohibited substance and testing positive for another prohibited substance.

Ferreira faced Jared Gordon on February 18, 2018, at UFC Fight Night: Cowboy vs. Medeiros. He won the fight via TKO in the first round.

Ferreira was expected to face John Makdessi on December 8, 2018, at UFC 231.  However, on November 28, 2018, it was reported that Makdessi was removed from the card and was replaced by Jesse Ronson.  However, on December 4, 2018. It was announced that Ronson was pulled out of the fight due to being too heavy to safely make Lightweight and was released from UFC. Ronson was replaced by newcomer Kyle Nelson. Ferreira won the fight via TKO in the second round.

Ferreira faced Rustam Khabilov on February 23, 2019, at UFC Fight Night 145. At the weigh-ins, Ferreira weighted at 157 pounds, 1 pound and over the lightweight non-title fight limit of 156. He was fined 20% of his purse  which went to his  opponent Khabilov. He won the fight by unanimous decision.

Ferreira was scheduled to face Francisco Trinaldo on May 11, 2019, at UFC 237. However, Ferreira was forced out of the bout on weigh-in day as he was deemed medically unfit due to a weight cutting issue. As a result, the bout was cancelled.

Ferreira faced Mairbek Taisumov on September 7, 2019, at UFC 242. He won the fight by unanimous decision.

Ferreira faced Anthony Pettis on January 18, 2020, at UFC 246. Ferreira defeated Pettis by submission in the second round. This win earned him a Performance of the Night award.

Ferreira was scheduled to face Drew Dober on May 2, 2020, at UFC Fight Night: Hermansson vs. Weidman. However, on April 9, Dana White, the president of UFC announced that this event was postponed to a future date The bout with Dober was rescheduled and was expected to take place on November 7, 2020, at UFC on ESPN: Santos vs. Teixeira.  In turn, Ferreira pulled out on October 22 due to an illness.

A rematch with Beneil Dariush took place on February 6, 2021, at UFC Fight Night 184. He lost the fight via split decision. This fight earned him the Fight of the Night award.

Ferreira faced Gregor Gillespie on May 8, 2021, at UFC on ESPN 24. At the weigh-ins, Ferreira weighed in at 160.5 pounds, four and a half pounds over the lightweight non-title fight limit. His bout proceeded at catchweight and he was fined 30% of his purse, which went to Gillespie. He lost the fight via technical knockout in round two. The bout was named Fight of the Night, but Ferreira was not eligible to receive the award after missing weight and the full bonus went to Gillespie.

Ferreira was scheduled to face Grant Dawson on October 2, 2021, at UFC Fight Night 193. However, Ferreira pulled out of the fight in early-September citing an injury.

Ferreira faced Mateusz Gamrot on December 19, 2021, at UFC Fight Night: Lewis vs. Daukaus. He lost the bout in the second round after verbally tapping due to a knee to his ribs.

Ferreira was scheduled to face Drakkar Klose on July 30, 2022, at UFC 277. However, Ferreira was forced out the event due an injury.

Personal life
Ferreira worked as a salesman in a mattress store before getting signed to the UFC. He is married to Yvonne Ferreira, and has three children.

Championships and accomplishments
Legacy Fighting Championship
Legacy FC Lightweight Championship (one time)
Ultimate Fighting Championship
Fight of the Night (Two times) 
Performance of the Night (Two times)

Mixed martial arts record 

|-
|Loss
|align=center|17–5
|Mateusz Gamrot
|TKO (submission to knee to the body)
|UFC Fight Night: Lewis vs. Daukaus
|
|align=center|2
|align=center|3:26
|Las Vegas, Nevada, United States
|
|-
|Loss
|align=center|17–4
|Gregor Gillespie
|TKO (elbows and punches)
|UFC on ESPN: Rodriguez vs. Waterson
|
|align=center|2
|align=center|4:51
|Las Vegas, Nevada, United States
|
|-
|Loss
|align=center|17–3
|Beneil Dariush
|Decision (split)
|UFC Fight Night: Overeem vs. Volkov
|
|align=center|3
|align=center|5:00
|Las Vegas, Nevada, United States
|
|-
|Win
|align=center|17–2
|Anthony Pettis
|Submission (rear-naked choke)
|UFC 246 
|
|align=center|2
|align=center|1:46
|Las Vegas, Nevada, United States
|
|-
|Win
|align=center|16–2
|Mairbek Taisumov
|Decision (unanimous)
|UFC 242 
|
|align=center|3
|align=center|5:00
|Abu Dhabi, United Arab Emirates
|
|-
|Win
|align=center|15–2
|Rustam Khabilov
|Decision (unanimous)
|UFC Fight Night: Błachowicz vs. Santos 
|
|align=center|3
|align=center|5:00
|Prague, Czech Republic
|
|-
|Win
|align=center|14–2
|Kyle Nelson
|TKO (punches)
|UFC 231 
|
|align=center|2
|align=center|1:23
|Toronto, Ontario, Canada
|
|-
|Win 
|align=center|13–2
|Jared Gordon
|TKO (punches)
|UFC Fight Night: Cowboy vs. Medeiros 
|
|align=center|1
|align=center|1:58
|Austin, Texas, United States
|
|-
|Win 
|align=center|12–2
|Olivier Aubin-Mercier
|Decision (unanimous)
|UFC on Fox: Johnson vs. Bader
|
|align=center|3
|align=center|5:00
|Newark, New Jersey, United States
|
|-
|Loss
|align=center|11–2
|Dustin Poirier
|KO (punches)
|UFC Fight Night: Mendes vs. Lamas
|
|align=center|1
|align=center|3:45
|Fairfax, Virginia, United States
|
|-
|Loss
|align=center|11–1
|Beneil Dariush
|Decision (unanimous)
|UFC 179
|
|align=center|3
|align=center|5:00
|Rio de Janeiro, Brazil
|
|-
|Win
|align=center|11–0
|Ramsey Nijem
|TKO (punches)
|UFC 177
|
|align=center|2
|align=center|1:53
|Sacramento, California, United States
|
|-
|Win
|align=center|10–0
|Colton Smith
|Submission (rear-naked choke)
|UFC Fight Night: Swanson vs. Stephens
|
|align=center|1
|align=center|0:38
|San Antonio, Texas United States
|
|-
|Win
|align=center|9–0
|Jorge Patino
|Decision (unanimous)
|Legacy FC 25
|
|align=center|5
|align=center|5:00
|Houston, Texas, United States
|
|-
|Win
|align=center|8–0
|Chris Feist
|Decision (unanimous)
|Legacy FC 24
|
|align=center|3
|align=center|5:00
|Dallas, Texas, United States
|
|-
|Win
|align=center|7–0
|Carlo Prater
|Decision (unanimous)
|Legacy FC 20
|
|align=center| 3
|align=center| 5:00
|Corpus Christi, Texas, United States
| 
|-
|Win
|align=center|6–0
|Danny Salinas
|Submission (rear-naked choke)
|STFC 24: Bad Blood
|
|align=center|2
|align=center|1:41
|McAllen, Texas, United States
|
|-
|Win
|align=center|5–0
|Jorge Cortez
|Submission (kimura)
|STFC 23: Ferreira vs. Cortez
|
|align=center|1
|align=center|0:43
|McAllen, Texas, United States
|
|-
|Win
|align=center| 4–0
|Travonne Hobbs
|Submission (arm-triangle choke)
|UWF: Tournament of Warriors Finale
|
|align=center|2
|align=center|1:57
|Corpus Christi, Texas, United States
|
|-
|Win
|align=center|3–0
|Hector Muñoz
|Submission (armbar)
|UWF: Tournament of Warriors Round 1
|
|align=center|1
|align=center|3:38
|Corpus Christi, Texas, United States
|
|-
|Win
|align=center|2–0
|Clint Roberts
|Submission (rear-naked choke)
|UWF 1: Huerta vs. War Machine
|
|align=center|2
|align=center|0:39
|Pharr, Texas, United States
|
|-
|Win
|align=center| 1–0
|Joseph Daily
|Decision (split)
|STFC 15
|
|align=center|3
|align=center|3:00
|McAllen, Texas, United States
|
|-

See also
 List of current UFC fighters
 List of male mixed martial artists

References

External links
  
 

Brazilian male mixed martial artists
1985 births
Living people
Lightweight mixed martial artists
Mixed martial artists utilizing boxing
Mixed martial artists utilizing judo
Mixed martial artists utilizing Brazilian jiu-jitsu
Brazilian expatriate sportspeople in the United States
Brazilian sportspeople in doping cases
Doping cases in mixed martial arts
Brazilian practitioners of Brazilian jiu-jitsu
People awarded a black belt in Brazilian jiu-jitsu
Brazilian male judoka
Sportspeople from Amazonas (Brazilian state)
Ultimate Fighting Championship male fighters